Corona del Sol High School is located in Tempe, Arizona, United States. It was established in 1977 and is a part of the Tempe Union High School District.

History 
The local architecture firm of Michael & Kemper Goodwin Ltd. was hired to design the school. The project included an early example of rooftop solar panels. The school opened in the fall of 1977. The school expanded in 1986 and in 2001.

As of 2010, Corona del Sol is an open-enrollment school.

Student demographics
During the 2018–2019 school year, Corona had an enrollment of about 2741 students. About 56% of the population are Caucasian, 24% are Hispanic, 8% are Asian, 6% are African American, 2% are Native American, and 4% are of
two or more races/ethnicities.

About 65% of graduates go on to attend a four-year university or college, 23% attend a two-year community college, and 10% move on to vocational training, military service, or full-time employment.

Athletics
State championships 
 1980 Football
 1992, 2013 Boys' Cross Country
 2008 Badminton
 1991, 2016, 2022 Girls Volleyball
 1980, 1981, 1989, 1994, 2012, 2013, 2014, 2015 Boys' Basketball
 1993, 1994, 2001 Girls' Basketball
 1994, 2010 Boys' Soccer
 1996, 2006, 2007 Girls' Soccer
 2009, 2010, 2017 Wrestling
 1997 Boys' Volleyball
 1993, 2009 Boys' Baseball
 1982,2003 Girls' Softball
 1982, 2014 Boys' Track and Field
 1981 (tied) Boys' Tennis
 1986 (tied) Girls' Tennis
 1982 Boys' Golf
 2021 Esports

Notable alumni

Alex Barcello, basketball player for the B.C. Oostende
Marvin Bagley III, basketball player for the Detroit Pistons
 Maceo Brown, plays rugby for the United States national rugby sevens team
Chris Cariaso, retired professional MMA fighter, formerly in the UFC
Slade Echeverria (class of 2008), lead singer and bass guitarist of the band Anarbor
Jesse Forbes, two-time All-State and NJCAA All-American wrestler; professional mixed martial artist, formerly with the UFC
Lyndsey Fry, member of the United States women's national ice hockey team and 2014 Sochi Winter Olympics silver medalist
Mark Goudeau, "Baseline Killer," serial killer and rapist responsible for nine murders
Eric Halvorsen, bassist of the band A Rocket to the Moon
Ashley Hansen, second baseman for the United States national softball team
Pat Kirch (class of 2008), drummer of the band The Maine
Saben Lee, professional basketball player for the Phoenix Suns
Freddy Lockhart, actor/comedian; Comedy Central Live At Gotham; star of Frank TV on TBS
Andrew "Scooter" Molander, quarterback at Phoenix College (division II), Colorado State (division I); NFL player (Cleveland Browns, Kansas City Chiefs, NY Giants); played in Arena Football League (AFL); current football head coach for Brophy College Preparatory in Phoenix
Avery Moss, defensive lineman for the New York Giants
Andrus Peat, offensive lineman for NFL's New Orleans Saints
Mike Pollak, player for the Indianapolis Colts
Dalen Terry, basketball player for the Chicago Bulls

References

External links 

 AIA School Profile

Public high schools in Arizona
Educational institutions established in 1977
Education in Tempe, Arizona
Schools in Maricopa County, Arizona
1977 establishments in Arizona